Galileo's Dream (2009) is a science fiction novel with elements of historical fiction written by author Kim Stanley Robinson. The book itself describes the life of 17th-century scientist and astronomer Galileo Galilei, and the far-future society living on the Galilean moons he discovered. Italicised portions of the text within the novel are actually translations of Galileo and his contemporaries own recorded writings.

It was published in hardcover on August 6, 2009, in the United Kingdom and on December 29, 2009, in the United States.

Reception
Robinson was praised for his depiction of Galileo in both his greatness and his weaknesses, and for the handling of themes such as the relation between our perception of time and memory.

References

External links
Galileo's Dream at KimStanleyRobinson.info

2009 American novels
American historical novels
Fiction set on Jupiter's moons
Novels by Kim Stanley Robinson
American science fiction novels
Fiction about trans-Neptunian objects
Cultural depictions of Galileo Galilei
HarperCollins books
Novels set in the 17th century
Novels set in Italy